Florian Himsl is an Austrian game developer and programmer best known for his work together with artist and designer Edmund McMillen, first and foremost the best-selling roguelike The Binding of Isaac but also the game Coil, which was nominated for the Innovation Award at the 2009 Independent Games Festival. He has also made games under the name Komix Games.

In 2022, Himsl released the game Ballfrog to mostly positive reviews.

Florian regularly appears on the podcast 'Is it kino?'. He is known for often expressing opinions that are contrarian to those of the other hosts, usually to their chagrin.

References

Browser game developers
Year of birth missing (living people)
Living people